Anssi Laine is a Finnish ice hockey coach. He is currently the head coach for KalPa of the Finnish Liiga.

On February 27, 2014, Laine replaced Jari Laukkanen to take over the head coaching duties for KalPa.

References

External links
Anssi Laine's profile at Eliteprospects.com

Year of birth missing (living people)
Living people
Finnish ice hockey coaches